The Sylvan Fire was a wildfire that started in the Sylvan Lake State Park in Colorado on June 20, 2021. The fire burned  and was fully contained on October 14, 2021.

Events

June 
The Sylvan Fire was first reported on June 20, 2021 at around 3:15 pm MST.

Cause 
The cause of the fire is believed to be due to lightning.

Containment 
On October 14, 2021, the Sylvan Fire reached 100% containment.

Impact

Closures and Evacuations

See also 

 2021 Colorado wildfires
 List of Colorado wildfires

References 

2021 in Colorado
June 2021 events in the United States
Wildfires in Colorado
2021 Colorado wildfires